Hu Manqi (17 August 1913 – 27 September 2015) was a Chinese politician. She was among the first group of women elected to the Legislative Yuan in 1948.

Biography
Originally from Kaifeng in Henan province, Hu became a primary school teacher. She also chaired the Henan Women's Association and became an officer for the Kuomintang in Kaifeng.

A member of the third Provisional Senate of Henan Province, she was a candidate in Henan in the 1948 elections to the Legislative Yuan, in which she was elected to parliament. After she failed to report for the fifth session, her membership of the legislature was cancelled. From 1949 she lived in Suzhou, where she died in 2015.

References

1913 births
Chinese schoolteachers
Members of the Kuomintang
20th-century Chinese women politicians
Members of the 1st Legislative Yuan
2015 deaths